The Randy Watson Experience is a supergroup which includes hip-hop/R&B musicians Questlove and James Poyser.

Career 
The group is named after an incidental character in the 1988 film Coming to America.

They have played on multiple NTS Radio shows, including Flaneur Radio.

Discography
2005: Motown Remixed - "I Heard It Through the Grapevine"
2006: Exit Music: Songs with Radio Heads - "Morning Bell"

References 

Hip hop record producers